Gray Plant Mooty (Gray, Plant, Mooty, Mooty & Bennett, P.A.) was the oldest continuing law practice in Minneapolis with offices in Minneapolis, MN, St. Cloud, MN, Fargo, ND and Washington, D.C.

History
Gray Plant Mooty was founded in Minneapolis in 1866 by Charles Woods. The firm became Woods & Hahn in 1881 with the addition of Minnesota Attorney General William J. Hahn and Joseph R. Kingman to the firm. In 1977 the firm adopted the name, Gray, Plant, Mooty, Mooty & Bennett, named for the attorneys Franklin Gray, Frank Plant, John Mooty, Melvin Mooty, and Russell Bennett.

Gray Plant Mooty combined with Harstad and Rainbow in 1990, and the firm opened a second office in St. Cloud, Minnesota following a combination with Hall & Byers in 2002. Gray Plant Mooty opened a third office in Washington, D.C. in 2005 and a fourth office in Fargo, North Dakota in 2014. In June 2015, the firm announced a merger with Fargo firm Sandin Law.

In January 2020, the firm combined with Lathrop & Gage to form a new firm, Lathrop GPM LLP.

Former Practice Areas
Banking & Financial Services
Corporate & Business
Employee Benefits & Executive Compensation
Family Law
Franchise & Distribution
Gaming Law
Government Relations
Health Law
Intellectual Property, Technology & Privacy
International Law
Labor, Employment & Higher Education
Litigation
Nonprofit & Tax Exempt Organizations
Real Estate, Environmental Law & Land Use
Trust, Estate & Charitable Planning

Notable Attorneys

Notable attorneys who worked at Gray Plant Mooty include:

William J. Hahn – Former Minnesota Attorney General
Myron Frans – Minnesota Management and Budget Commissioner and former Minnesota Revenue Commissioner
Amy Klobuchar - United States Senator from Minnesota and former County Attorney for Hennepin County, Minnesota
Robert Stein – Former executive director of the American Bar Association
Michael P. Sullivan – Former President and CEO of Dairy Queen
Susan Gaertner – Former County Attorney for Ramsey County, Minnesota

Notable Rankings and Awards

Notable recognition for the Gray Plant Mooty firm and its attorneys included:

Ranked among the top law firms globally for franchise law by Chambers and Partners. The firm is also ranked among the top Minnesota firms in Corporate/M&A, Labor & Employment, and Litigation.
Recognized by Franchise Times with the largest number of franchise attorney "Legal Eagles" from a single firm.
Ranked by World Trademark Review 1000 as among the world's leading trademark professionals.
Recognized by Who’s Who Legal with the most franchise attorney honorees from a single firm.
Recognized by The National Law Journal's "Top 100 Verdicts of 2013" for the firm's $23.78 million verdict for Relco in an intellectual property dispute.

References

External links
Lathrop GPM

Law firms established in 1866
Law firms based in Minneapolis